Herra means "Lord" in Finnish and "Sir" in Icelandic. It is now generally used in Finnish as an honorific for all men, the equivalent to the English titles "Mister," "Sir," and "gentleman". In the Finnish Defence Forces, a superior is addressed with herra (or in case of a female superior, rouva) followed by the rank of the superior. The address starts the conversation but is not repeated. For example, herra luutnantti is the same address as "Lieutenant Sir!"

Written herra Halonen or hra Halonen, the plural is herrat. This formal form of address is rare, used in the army and in the parliament. This title is commonly not prefixed to a first name, as it connotes a lord in past centuries (e.g., herra Kaarle or Kaarle-herra gives an impression similar to that of Mylord Charles or Lord Charles).

In earlier centuries of the civilization, herra, similar to Lord, Sieur, Seigneur, and Freiherr, meant the owner of a lordship. The Finnish noble rank vapaaherra (baron) is a continuation of this meaning. Usually, noble landowners and high priests were "herra". At those times, no commoner would have been called herra. Indeed, several older fiction works show that commoners would react to being called herra with derision ("I am no herra!").

When capitalized, "Herra" refers to The Lord, i.e., Christian God.

The usual female counterpart of herra is rouva. The equivalent of Miss is neiti.

The more archaic female variant, herratar has not evolved — its meaning and impression given is still that of the feudal fiefholder.

This word has the same meaning and usage in Icelandic and Estonian as "Härra".

Herra is also a last name.

Honorifics

fi:Herra